Lluís Claramunt (Barcelona, August 19, 1951 - Zarautz, December 18, 2000) was a Catalan artist.

Biography 
A self-taught artist, Claramunt belongs to a generation that tried to be of its time without belonging to it. The start of his career in the 1970s coincided with the emergence of a more politicised approach to art to which most of his contemporaries subscribed, at a time when Barcelona was teeming with experimental initiatives in the spheres of art, literature and film, as well as underground subcultures.

During this period, Claramunt swam against the tide, focusing on painting rather than looking to the avant-gardes for inspiration. The finishes of naturalist painting, and in particular the work of Isidre Nonell, became the first rung of the ladder that Claramunt would build in the course of his life. The subject matter and style of his work gradually changed as Claramunt physically and socially distanced himself from Barcelona.

Solo exhibits list 

 1971 - Taller de Picasso, Barcelona
 1972 - Galería Fulmen, Sevilla
 1972 - Tur Social, Alicante
 1972 - Peña Flamenca Enrique Morente, Barcelona
 1973 - Taller de Picasso, Barcelona
 1976 - Galeria Dau al Set, Barcelona
 1979 - Galeria Dau al Set, Barcelona
 1982 - 15 anys de pintura. Galeria Dau al Set, Barcelona
 1984 - Galeria 4 Gats, Palma
 1984 - ARCO 84, estand Galeria Quatre Gats, Madrid
 1984 - Galería Buades, Madrid
 1985 - Galería Fúcares, Almagro, Ciudad Real
 1985 - Galeria Dau al Set, Barcelona
 1985 - Galería Magda Bellotti, Algeciras, Cádiz
 1985 - Galería La Máquina Española, Sevilla
 1986 - ARCO 86, estand Galería Dau al Set, Madrid
 1986 - Museo de Arte Contemporáneo, Sevilla
 1987 - Galeria Sebastià Petit, Lleida
 1987 - Galería Juana de Aizpuru, Madrid
 1987 - 1983-1986 Pinturas. Palau Sollerich, Palma de Mallorca
 1987 - ARCO 87, estand Galeria Dau al Set, Madrid
 1987 - Galería Magda Bellotti, Algeciras, Cádiz
 1987 - Galería Rafael Ortiz, Sevilla
 1988 - ARCO 88, estand Galería Magda Bellotti, Madrid
 1988 - Axe Art Actuel, Toulouse
 1988 - Toro de invierno. Ateneu Mercantil, València
 1988 - Galeria Ferran Cano, Palma de Mallorca
 1989 - Galerie Bleich-Rossi, Graz (Austria)
 1989 - Galería Juana de Aizpuru, Madrid
 1989 - Galería Juana de Aizpuru, Sevilla
 1989 - Gallery July Silvester, New York
 1991 - Galeria Ferran Cano, Palma de Mallorca
 1991 - Galerie Bleich-Rossi, Graz (Àustria)
 1991 - Galeria Temple, València
 1991 - Aschenbach Galerie, Amsterdam
 1991 - Galeria Màcula, Alacant
 1992 - La muela de oro. Galería Juana de Aizpuru, Madrid
 1992 - Paisaje. Galería Juana de Aizpuru, Sevilla
 1993 - Valderrobres. Galería Juana de Aizpuru, Madrid
 1993 - Valderrobres. Museu Nacional de História Natural, Lisboa
 1993 - Luis Claramunt. Galería Juana de Aizpuru, Sevilla
 1994 - Luis Claramunt. Galería Juana de Aizpuru, Sevilla
 1994 - Ölbilder. Galerie Bleich-Rossi, Graz (Àustria)
 1994 - Tentadero. Galería Tomás March, València
 1995 - Galería Antonio de Barnola, Barcelona
 1995 - Caja Rural de Huesca, Saragossa
 1996 - Dibujos. Galería Antonio de Barnola, Barcelona
 1996 - Espai Sarrià, Barcelona
 1997 - Congo money. Galería Juana de Aizpuru, Sevilla
 1997 - Luis Claramunt. Galerie Bleich-Rossi, Graz (Àustria)
 1997 - Galeria Antonio de Barnola, Barcelona
 1998 - Luis Claramunt. Galerie Bleich-Rossi, Graz (Àustria)
 1998 - Galeria Antonio de Barnola, Barcelona
 1999 - Naufragios y tormentas. Galería Juana de Aizpuru, Madrid
 2000 - Naufragios y tormentas. Galería Miguel Marcos, Barcelona
 2000 - Naufragios y tormentas. Galería Juana de Aizpuru, Sevilla
 2002 - … de Marruecos. Galería Juana de Aizpuru, Madrid
 2009 - Marruecos. Festival Mar de Músicas, Palacio Viuda de Molina, Cartagena
 2012 - El viatge vertical. Museu d'Art Contemporani de Barcelona, Barcelona

References

External links 
 Official website
 Claramunt exhibit at MACBA

Artists from Catalonia
People from Barcelona
1951 births
2000 deaths